Injambakkam is a locality in the south of Chennai in the Indian state of Tamil Nadu. Being a part of the Walajabad block of the district, its panchayat is part of Walajabad panchayat union. Injambakkam is located along the ECR.

Demographics
In the 2001 India census, Injambakkam had a population of 10,084. Males constituted 52% of the population and females 48%. Injambakkam had an average literacy rate of 73%, higher than the national average of 59.5%: male literacy was 78%, and female literacy was 68%. In 2001 in Injambakkam, 15% of the population was under 6 years of age.

In the 2011 census, Injambakkam had a population of 23,346.

Location in context

References

Cities and towns in Chennai district
Neighbourhoods in Chennai
Coastal neighbourhoods of Chennai